Sophiahemmet University is a Swedish institution for higher education associated with Sophiahemmet. In addition to a degree in nursing, the institution also offers programmes at advanced level, such as Specialist Nursing programmes, as well as Bachelor, Master and Diploma programmes. Sophiahemmet Högskola has approximately 450 students enrolled in the three-year nursing programme and a total of approximately 1500 students on a yearly basis. Education is only offered in Swedish. Sophiahemmet University College was founded in 1884 by Queen Sophia.

External links
 Official website for Sophiahemmet University College 
 Sophiahemmet University College 

University colleges in Sweden
19th century in Stockholm